Agonopterix thapsiella is a moth of the family Depressariidae. It is found in France, Spain, Portugal, Italy, Hungary, Greece and on Sardinia, Sicily and Crete.

References

External links
lepiforum.de

Moths described in 1847
Agonopterix
Moths of Europe